Le Quesnel is a commune in the Somme department in Hauts-de-France in northern France.

Geography

Population

Places of interest
 Church of Saint Leger, known as the Cathedral of the Santerre" as it is the biggest church in the region, with a 50m high tower.
 The Le Quesnel Canadian Battlefield Memorial and Commemorative park.

See also
Communes of the Somme department

References

External links

 The Canadian Memorial Gardens website

Communes of Somme (department)